Clara Sousa-Silva is a research scientist at Center for Astrophysics  Harvard & Smithsonian. Sousa-Silva is an expert on phosphine. She has contributed to investigations of the possibility of life on Venus, working with Jane Greaves and others. Sousa-Silva also directs the Harvard-MIT Student Research Mentoring Program, which pairs high school students with astronomers to conduct research.

References

External links

Living people
Alumni of the University of Edinburgh
Alumni of University College London
Harvard–Smithsonian Center for Astrophysics people
21st-century scientists
Year of birth missing (living people)